A Very Merry Chipmunk is a 1994 music album by Alvin and the Chipmunks, released by Sony Wonder.  It is their fourth Christmas album. The album reached #147 on the Billboard 200. It was the first in a series of 25 Christmas compilation albums put forth by Turner Broadcasting company. The fact that it appeared on the Billboard 200, caused Sony to print 5,000 more copies, resulting in a sudden decline in pricing. Wal-Mart put a special on it for 97 cents shortly after Christmas 1994.

Track listing
 "Here Comes Christmas" (Thomas Chase/Steve Rucker/Jill H. Roberts)  – 2:40
Musicians and vocalists
Jai Winding — keyboards
Ron Hicklin — singing voice of Alvin
Gene Morford — singing voice of Simon
Randy Crenshaw — singing voice of Theodore
Production crew
Guy DeFazio — engineer
 "The Chipmunk Song (Christmas Don't Be Late)" (with Kenny G) (Ross Bagdasarian Sr.)  – 5:33
Musicians and vocalists
Kenny G — saxophone
Dean Parks — guitar
Nathan East — bass
John Capek — keyboards
Michael Botts — drums and percussion
Gerry Beckley — singing voice of Alvin
Andrew Gold — singing voice of Simon
Jeff Foskett — singing voice of Theodore
Production crew
John Boylan — co-producer
Bob Wartinbee — recording engineer
Steve Shepherd — recording engineer
Guy DeFazio — recording engineer
Duane Seykora — assistant recording engineer
Jerry Finn — assistant recording engineer
Paul Grupp — mixing engineer
Roland Alvarez — mixing engineer
 "Rockin' Around the Christmas Tree" (with Patty Loveless) (Johnny Marks)  – 3:37
Musicians and vocalists
Patty Loveless — lead vocals
B. James Lowry — lead guitar
Dan Dugmore — steel guitar
Gordon Kennedy — rhythm guitar
Mike Brignardello — bass
Paul Leim — drums
Wayne Kirkpatrick — singing voice of Alvin
Bergen White — singing voice of Simon
Chris Harris — singing voice of Theodore
Production crew
John Boylan — co-producer
Steve Bishir — recording engineer
Martin Woodley — assistant recording engineer
Paul Grupp — mixing engineer
Roland Alvarez — mixing engineer
 "Christmas Time Uptown" (with The Boys Choir of Harlem) (Paul Espel/Karmyn Lott/Malcom Dodds)  – 4:45
Musicians and vocalists
The Boys Choir of Harlem — vocals
Ross Bagdasarian — Chipmunk vocals and all instruments
Production crew
Dr. Walter J. Turnbull — choir director
M. Roger Holland — vocal arrangement
Darren "Nitro" Clowers — co-producer
Bob Friedrich — recording engineer
Mark Agostino — recording engineer
Coney Abrams — mixing engineer
 "A Comes Before B" (Janice Karman)  – 2:13
Musicians and vocalists
Jai Winding — keyboards
Ross Bagdasarian — Alvin (speaking voice)
Andrew Gold — Alvin (singing voice)
Production crew
Guy DeFazio — engineer
 "Rudolph the Red-Nosed Reindeer" (with Gene Autry) (Johnny Marks)  – 2:44
Musicians and vocalists
Gene Autry — lead vocal
John Capek — keyboards, programming
Nick Brown — guitar
Bob Mann — bass
Michael Botts — drums
Ron Hicklin — singing voice of Alvin
John Andrew Parks — singing voice of Simon
Randy Crenshaw — singing voice of Theodore
Production crew
John Boylan — co-producer
Ian Gardiner — recording engineer
Guy DeFazio — recording engineer
Bob Loftus — assistant recording engineer
Naoki Taya — assistant recording engineer
Paul Grupp — mixing engineer
Roland Alvarez — mixing engineer
 "Petit Papa Noël" (with Celine Dion) (Raymond Vinci/Henry Martinet)  – 5:29
Musicians and vocalists
Celine Dion — lead vocals
Andrew Gold — keyboards/guitar/keyboard programming
Ron Hicklin — singing voice of Alvin
Gene Morford — singing voice of Simon
Randy Crenshaw — singing voice of Theodore
Production crew
John Boylan — co-producer
Andrew Gold — co-producer/recording engineer
Umberto Gatica — recording engineer
Guy DeFazio — recording engineer
Stephen Harrison — assistant recording engineer
Bob Loftus — assistant recording engineer
Naoki Taya — assistant recording engineer
Paul Grupp — mixing engineer
Roland Alvarez — mixing engineer
 "Santa's Gonna Come in a Pickup Truck" (with Alan Jackson) (Don Rich/Red Simpson)  – 4:13
Musicians and vocalists
Alan Jackson — lead vocal
Eddie Bayers — drums
Brent Mason — electric guitar
Roy Husky — bass
Hargus "Pig" Robbins — piano
Stuart Duncan — fiddle
Bruce Watkins — acoustic guitar
Paul Franklin — steel guitar
Wayne Kirkpatrick — singing voice of Alvin
Bergen White — singing voice of Simon
Chris Harris — singing voice of Theodore
Production crew
Keith Stegall — co-producer
Steve Bishir — recording engineer
Guy DeFazio — mixing engineer
 "The Little Drummer Boy" (with The UCLA Chamber Singers) (Katherine Davis/Henry Onorati/Harry Simeone)  – 4:18
Musicians and vocalists
The UCLA Chamber Singers — principal vocals
John Capek — keyboards and programming
Michael Botts — drums
Ron Hicklin — singing voice of Alvin
Gene Morford — singing voice of Simon
Randy Crenshaw — singing voice of Theodore
Production crew
John Boylan — co-producer
Ian Gardiner — recording engineer
Paul Grupp — recording engineer/mixing engineer
Guy DeFazio — recording engineer
Roland Alvarez — assistant recording engineer/mixing engineer
 "I Don't Want to Be Alone for Christmas (Unless I'm Alone with You)" (performed by James Ingram) (Steve Lindsey)  – 6:32
Musicians and vocalists
James Ingram — vocals
Robbie Buchanan — keyboards/drum programming
Brandon Fields — saxophone
Production crew
Steve Lindsey — producer
Gabe Veltri — recording engineer
John Hendrickson — assistant recording engineer
Jim Champagne — assistant recording engineer
Bill Schnee — mixing engineer
 "The Chipmunk Song (Christmas Don't Be Late)" (Reprise) (with Kenny G) (Ross Bagdasarian Sr.)  – 3:27 — same credits as track 2

For all tracks
Musicians and vocalists
 Ross Bagdasarian Jr. — spoken voices of Alvin, Simon and David Seville
 Janice Karman — spoken voices of Theodore and Brittany
Production crew
Ross Bagdasarian — producer
Janice Karman — writer/producer
Marc Rashba — marketing and promotion
Denice Ferguson — production coordinator
Teri Wegel — production coordinator
Traci Sterling — production coordinator (on Patty Loveless' and Alan Jackson's vocals)

References

Alvin and the Chipmunks albums
1994 Christmas albums
Christmas compilation albums
1994 compilation albums
Columbia Records albums